Ravi Singh may refer to:

 Ravi Singh (businessman), Indian-American entrepreneur, author, and former politician
 Ravi Singh (humanitarian) (born 1969), British-Indian humanitarian
 Ravi Singh (cricketer) (born 1974), Indian-born cricketer
 Ravi Inder Singh (born 1987), Indian cricketer
 Ravi Inder Singh (industrialist) (born 1940), Indian industrialist and politician